Khaneqah Sorkh (also Romanized as Khāneqāh Sorkh, Khānaqāh Sorkh, and Khānqāh-e Sorkh) is a village in Nazlu-e Shomali Rural District of Nazlu District of Urmia County, West Azerbaijan province, Iran. At the 2006 National Census, its population was 1,469 in 362 households. The following census in 2011 counted 1,729 people in 484 households. The latest census in 2016 showed a population of 1,789 people in 517 households; it was the largest village in its rural district.

References 

Urmia County

Populated places in West Azerbaijan Province

Populated places in Urmia County